Joseph-Philippe-François Deleuze (12 April 1753, in Sisteron – 29 October 1835, in Paris) was an 18th–19th-century French naturalist.

Biography 
J. P. F. Deleuze studied in Paris and became assistant naturalist at the National Museum of Natural History in 1795. He collaborated with Antoine Laurent de Jussieu (1748-1836). An assistant naturalist and librarian of the Natural History Museum, he is best known for being a proponent of the theory of animal magnetism and suggested the French Academy of Sciences study it. Joseph Philippe François Deleuze was a resident member of the Société des observateurs de l'homme. In 1817, Deleuze was elected a member of the American Philosophical Society.

Honours 
The genus Leuzea was dedicated to Deleuze by Swiss botanist Augustin Pyrame de Candolle.

Selected list of publications 

 1804: Notice historique sur André Michaux, Annales du Muséum National d'Histoire Naturelle, tome 3, An XII. 
 1807: Éloge historique de François Péron, included in the Voyage de découvertes aux terres australes, exécuté sur les corvettes le Géographe, le Naturaliste et la goëlette le Casuarina, pendant les années 1800, 1801, 1802, 1803 et 1804, 3 volumes (1807-1816), Impr. impériale (Paris). 
 1813: Histoire critique du magnétisme animal, deux volumes, in-8°, reprinted in 1819, Mame (Paris).
 1819: Introduction pratique sur le magnétisme animal, suivie d'une lettre écrite à l'auteur par un médecin étranger, reprinted in 1836. J.-G. Dentu (Paris), in-8°, ii + 472 p.
 1810: Eudoxe, entretiens sur l'étude des sciences, des lettres et de la philosophie, two volumes, in-8°, F. Schoell (Paris).
 1823: Histoire et description du Muséum royal d'histoire naturelle, A. Royer (Paris) : 720 p. 
 1826: Lettre à MM. les membres de l'Académie de médecine, sur la marche qu'il convient de suivre pour fixer l'opinion publique relativement à la réalité du magnétisme animal, Béchet Jeune (Paris) : 39 p. 

Translations
 1799: Les Amours des plantes, poème en quatre chants, suivi de notes et de dialogues sur la poésie, ouvrage traduit de l'anglais de Darwin (The Loves of Plants) by Erasmus Darwin (1731-1802).
 1801: Les Saisons by James Thomson (1700–1748), preceded by a Notice sur la vie et les écrits de Thomson by the translator.

References

Bibliography 

Biographie des hommes remarquables des Basses-Alpes ou Dictionnaire historique des tous les personnages de ce département qui se sont signalés par leur génie, leurs talents, leurs travaux, la sainteté de leur vie, leurs vertus, ou leurs actes de bienfaisance, depuis les temps les plus reculés jusqu'à nos jours, Repos, Digne, 1850, p. 89-90
Philippe Jaussaud et Edouard-Raoul Brygoo, Du jardin au Muséum : en 516 biographies, Publications scientifiques du Muséum national d'histoire naturelle, Paris, 2004, 630 p.
Angèle Kremer-Marietti; Les Entretiens de Joseph-Philippe-François Deleuze, in Épistémologiques, philosophiques, anthropologiques, L'Harmattan, 2005, p. 201 et suiv.

External links 
 Joseph-Philippe-François Deleuze on Data.bnf.fr

French librarians
French taxonomists
Botanists with author abbreviations
1753 births
1835 deaths
English–French translators
People from Sisteron
18th-century French botanists
19th-century French botanists
National Museum of Natural History (France) people
19th-century translators